Dimethylphenylphosphine  is an organophosphorus compound with a formula P(C6H5)(CH3)2. The phosphorus is connected to a phenyl group and two methyl groups, making it the simplest aromatic alkylphosphine. It is colorless air sensitive liquid.  It is a member of series (CH3)3-n(C6H5)2P that also includes n = 0,  n = 2, and  n = 3 that are often employed as ligands in metal phosphine complexes.

Preparation
Dimethylphenylphosphine is prepared by the reaction of methylmagnesium halide with dichlorophenylphosphine.

(C6H5)Cl2P  +  2CH3MgBr  →  (C6H5)(CH3)2P  +  2MgBrCl

The phosphine is purified by distillation under reduced pressure.
A solution of (C6H5)(CH3)2P in CDCl3 shows proton NMR signals at δ 7.0-7.5 and a doublet at δ 1.2. The phosphorus-31 NMR spectrum shows a singlet at -45.9 ppm in CDCl3.

Structure and properties
Dimethylphenylphosphine is a pyramidal molecule where the phenyl group and two methyl groups are connected to the phosphorus. The bond length and angles are the following: P-CMe: 1.844, P-CPh: 1.845 Å, C-C: 1.401 Å, C-HMe: 1.090 Å, C-HPh: 1.067 Å, C-P-C: 96.9°, C-P-C (ring): 103.4°, P-C-H: 115.2°.

When attached to chiral metal centers, the P-methyl groups are diastereotopic, appearing as separate doublets in the 1H NMR spectrum.

Comparisons with related phosphine ligands
The νCO of IrCl(CO)(PPh3)2 and IrCl(CO)(PMe2Ph)2 are both at 1960 cm−1, whereas νCO for IrCl(CO)(PMe3)2 is at 1938 cm−1.

In terms of basicity, dimethylphenylphosphine is intermediate between that of trialkyl- and triphenylphosphine:
[HPEt3]+ = 8.7
[HPMe2Ph]+ = 6.8
[HPPh3]+ = 2.7

The ligand cone angle (θ) is the apex angle of a cylindrical cone, which is centered 2.28 Å from the center of the P atom. However, the cone angle of an unsymmetrical ligand cannot be determined in the same. In order to determine an effective cone angle for an unsymmetrical ligand PX1X2X3, the following equation is used:

Where θi represent the half angle.

The resulting angles for PMe3, PMe2Ph, PPh3 are:
PMe3 = 118°, PMe2Ph = 122°, PPh3 = 145°. Thus, PMe2Ph is intermediate in size relative to PMe3 and PPh3.

References

Tertiary phosphines
Phenyl compounds